A minimum viable product (MVP) is a version of a product with just enough features to be usable by early customers who can then provide feedback for future product development.

A focus on releasing an MVP means that developers potentially avoid lengthy and (possibly) unnecessary work. Instead, they iterate on working versions and respond to feedback, challenging and validating assumptions about a product's requirements. The term was coined and defined in 2001 by Frank Robinson and then popularized by Steve Blank and Eric Ries. It may also involve carrying out market analysis beforehand. The MVP is analogous to experimentation in the scientific method applied in the context of validating business hypotheses.  It is utilized so that prospective entrepreneurs would know whether a given business idea would actually be viable and profitable by testing the assumptions behind a product or business idea. The concept can be used to validate a market need for a product and for incremental developments of an existing product. As it tests a potential business model to customers to see how the market would react, it is especially useful for new/startup companies who are more concerned with finding out where potential business opportunities exist rather than executing a prefabricated, isolated business model.

Description 
A minimum viable product has just enough core features to effectively deploy the product, and no more. Developers typically deploy the product to a subset of possible customers, such as early adopters who are thought to be more forgiving, more likely to give feedback, and able to grasp a product vision from an early prototype or marketing information. This strategy targets avoiding building products that customers do not want and seek to maximize information about the customer with the least money spent. The technique falls under the Lean Startup methodology as MVPs aim to test business hypotheses and validated learning is one of the five principles of the Lean Startup method. It contrasts strongly with the traditional "stealth mode" method of product development where businesses make detailed business plans spanning a considerable time horizon. Steve Blank posited that the main principle of the Lean Startup approach rests in the validation of the hypotheses underlying the product by asking customers if they want the product or if the product meets their needs, and pivoting to another approach if the hypothesis turns out to be false. This approach to validating business ideas cheaply before substantial investment saves costs and limits risk as businesses that upon experimentation turn out to be commercially unfeasible can easily be terminated. It is especially important as the main cause of startup failure is the lack of market need; that is, many startups fail because their product isn't needed by many people, and so they cannot generate enough revenue to recoup the initial investment. Thus it can be said that utilizing an MVP would illuminate a prospective entrepreneur on the market demand for their products.

For example, in 2015, specialists from the University of Sydney devised the Rippa robot to automate farm and weed management. Before it was released, the technical hypothesis – that the robot can distinguish weeds from farm plants – had already been proven.  But the business hypothesis – that it would be a viable tool on a working farm – still needed to be proved. The application of the MVP method here is that the business hypothesis, and only if it proves successful will further development be invested.

"The minimum viable product is that version of a new product a team uses to collect the maximum amount of validated learning about customers with the least effort." The definition's use of the words maximum and minimum means it is not formulaic. It requires judgment to figure out, for any given context, what MVP makes sense. Due to this vagueness, the term MVP is commonly used, either deliberately or unwittingly, to refer to a much broader notion ranging from a rather prototype-like product to a fully-fledged and marketable product.

An MVP can be part of a strategy and process directed toward making and selling a product to customers. It is a core artifact in an iterative process of idea generation, prototyping, presentation, data collection, analysis and learning. One seeks to minimize the total time spent on an iteration. The process is iterated until a desirable product/market fit is obtained, or until the product is deemed non-viable.

Steve Blank typically refers to minimum viable product as minimum feature set.

Purposes
 Test a product hypothesis with minimal resources
 Accelerate learning
 Reduce wasted engineering hours
 Get the product to early customers as soon as possible
 Find a base for other products
 Establish a builder's abilities in crafting the product required
 Build a brand very quickly

Testing
 Testing is the essence of minimum viable products. As described above, an MVP seeks to test out whether an idea works in market environments while using the least possible expenditure. This would be beneficial as it reduces the risk of innovating (so that enormous amounts of capital would not have to be sacrificed before proving that the concept does not actually work), and allowing for gradual, market-tested expansion models such as the real options model. A simple method of testing the financial viability of an idea would be discovery-driven planning, which first tests the financial viability of new ventures by carefully examining the assumptions behind the idea by a reverse income statement (first, begin with the income you want to obtain, then the costs the new invention would take, and see if the required amount of revenue that must be gained for the project to work). Results from a minimum viable product test aim to indicate if the product should be built, to begin with. Testing evaluates if the initial problem or goal is solved in a manner that makes it reasonable to move forward.

Notable quotes
 Steve Blank: "You’re selling the vision and delivering the minimum feature set to visionaries, not everyone."

Marketing 
Releasing and assessing the impact of a minimum viable product is a market testing strategy that is used to screen product ideas soon after their generation. In software development, the release is facilitated by rapid application development tools and languages common to web application development.

The MVP differs from the conventional market testing strategy of investing time and money early to implement a product before testing it in the market. It is intended to ensure that the market wants the product before large time and monetary investments are made. The MVP differs from the open-source software methodology of release early, release often that listens to users, letting them define the features and future of the product. Instead, the MVP starts with a product vision, which is maintained throughout the product life cycle, although it is adapted based on the explicit and implicit (indirect measures) feedback from potential future customers of the product.

The MVP is a strategy that may be used as a part of Blank's customer development methodology that focuses on continual product iteration and refinement based on customer feedback. Additionally, the presentation of non-existing products and features may be refined using web-based statistical hypothesis testing, such as A/B testing.

Business Model Canvas
The Business Model Canvas is used to map in the major components and activities for a company starting out. The minimum viable product can be designed by using selected components of the Business Model Canvas:

 Customers Customers on the Business Model Canvas denote to whom a value proposition is considered for. Utilizing the minimum viable concept here would be useful to determine whether the selected customer segment actually wants that product, either from questionnaires or experimental launches. Whichever method is chosen, the key in using the MVP is to spend as little as possible while learning as much as possible, thus in this case validating the market with the least possible cost.

 Value proposition The value proposition details what does a business offer to its customers – what desires it satisfies or what problems it solves. In this case, usage of the MVP would focus more on the technical feasibilities of the product (whether such value is possible to deliver using the product), as in the Rippa case described earlier.

 Channels In the business model canvas lingo, channels refer to the ways by which a business delivers value to its customers. MVPs would thus be used here to test whether a newly proposed method of value delivery (for example new channels of distribution, innovations in supply chains) works.

 Relationship As its name implies, relationships refer to how a business attracts and maintains its customers by providing them with the treatment and care they expect. MVPs here would be used to learn if customers would better appreciate a new method of relationship building, and true to the MVP concept the test would seek to learn as much as possible whilst sacrificing the least amount of brand equity, reputation, or costs possible.

Emerging applications
Concepts from minimum viable products are applied in other aspects of startups and organizations.

Minimum viable brand (MVB) 
Using a minimum viable brand (MVB) concept can ensure brand hypotheses are grounded in strategic intent and market insights.

Minimum viable co-founder
Finding other people to create a minimum viable product is a common challenge for new companies and startups.  The concept of minimum viable co-founder is based on looking for a co-founder with the following attributes:
 Trust
 Exceptional at building or selling
 Company commitment
 Personally likable
 Productivity
 Reasonable
 Rational
 Realistic

Minimum viable team
Founders with an early-stage company are faced with the challenge of building a team with minimal people and cost. The process starts by listing out basic functions of a particular company (e.g., engineer, operations, finance) and then stripping down to the abstract job activities and skills that the company must have to operate.

Criticism 
Some research has shown that early release of an MVP may hurt a company more than help when companies risk imitation by a competitor and have not established other barriers to imitation. It has also indicated that negative feedback on an MVP can negatively affect a company's reputation. Many developers of mobile and digital products are now criticizing the MVP because customers can easily switch between competing products through platforms (e.g. app stores). Also, products that do not offer the expected minimum standard of quality are inferior to competitors that enter the market with a higher standard.

A notable limitation of the MVP is rooted in its approach that seeks out to test its ideas to the market. Since the business's new product ideas can be inferred from their testing, the method may be unsuited to environments where the protection of the intellectual property is limited (and where products are easily imitated).

The criticism of the MVP approach has led to several new approaches,
e.g. the Minimum Viable Experiment MVE,
the Minimum Awesome Product MAP,
or the Simple, Lovable, Complete.

See also 
 Lean startup
 Minimum marketable feature
 Mockup
 Pilot experiment
 Proof of concept
 Startup company
 The Cathedral and the Bazaar

References 

Product development
Systems engineering

External links

 MVP Development